is a subway station on the Tokyo Metro Fukutoshin Line in Shibuya, Tokyo, Japan, operated by the Tokyo subway operator Tokyo Metro.

Lines
Kita-sando Station is served by the Tokyo Metro Fukutoshin Line, and is numbered "F-14".

Station layout
The station has a single island platform serving two tracks, located on the second basement ("B2F") level.

Platforms

Passenger statistics
In fiscal 2013, the station was the 124th-busiest on the Tokyo Metro network with an average of 18,327 passengers daily. The passenger statistics for previous years are as shown below.

History
The station was opened on June 14, 2008.

References

External links
 Kita-sando Station Information (Tokyo Metro)

Railway stations in Tokyo
Railway stations in Japan opened in 2008
Tokyo Metro Fukutoshin Line
Stations of Tokyo Metro